Alderton is a village in Shropshire, England.

See also
Listed buildings in Myddle and Broughton

External links

Villages in Shropshire